The Grand Cinema was a cinema complex located in Hong Kong in the Elements Mall at Kowloon MTR station. Operating from 2007 to 2019 with 12 screens and 1,600 seats, it was Hong Kong's largest multiplex cinema in its time. It had an "active", "infrasonic" sound system and screened independent films.It is the site of the Hong Kong Asian Independent Film Festival. The cinema was operated by Shaw Group and Multiplex Cinema Ltd.

The former site of The Grand was acquired by Broadway Circuit and rebranded as the Premiere Cinema.

See also
 List of cinemas in Hong Kong

References

External links

 The Grand Cinema official site

Cinemas in Hong Kong
West Kowloon